Manicoré River is a river of Amazonas state in north-western Brazil.

The headwaters of the river are in the Campos Amazônicos National Park, a  protected area created in 2006 that holds an unusual enclave of cerrado vegetation in the Amazon rainforest.
Further north the river defines part of the eastern boundary of the  Campos de Manicoré Environmental Protection Area, created in April 2016 just before the provisional removal of president Dilma Rousseff.
It then flows through the  Manicoré Biological Reserve, which was created at the same time.

See also
List of rivers of Amazonas

References
Brazilian Ministry of Transport

Rivers of Amazonas (Brazilian state)